In geometry, the great stellated dodecahedron is a Kepler-Poinsot polyhedron, with Schläfli symbol {,3}. It is one of four nonconvex regular polyhedra.

It is composed of 12 intersecting pentagrammic faces, with three pentagrams meeting at each vertex.

It shares its vertex arrangement, although not its vertex figure or vertex configuration, with the regular dodecahedron, as well as being a stellation of a (smaller) dodecahedron. It is the only dodecahedral stellation with this property, apart from the dodecahedron itself. Its dual, the great icosahedron, is related in a similar fashion to the icosahedron.

Shaving the triangular pyramids off results in an icosahedron.

If the pentagrammic faces are broken into triangles, it is topologically related to the triakis icosahedron, with the same face connectivity, but much taller isosceles triangle faces. If the triangles are instead made to invert themselves and excavate the central icosahedron, the result is a great dodecahedron.

The great stellated dodecahedron can be constructed analogously to the pentagram, its two-dimensional analogue, by attempting to stellate the n-dimensional pentagonal polytope which has pentagonal polytope faces and simplex vertex figures until it can no longer be stellated; that is, it is its final stellation.

Images

Related polyhedra

A truncation process applied to the great stellated dodecahedron produces a series of uniform polyhedra. Truncating edges down to points produces the great icosidodecahedron as a rectified great stellated dodecahedron. The process completes as a birectification, reducing the original faces down to points, and producing the great icosahedron.

The truncated great stellated dodecahedron is a degenerate polyhedron, with 20 triangular faces from the truncated vertices, and 12 (hidden) pentagonal faces as truncations of the original pentagram faces, the latter forming a great dodecahedron inscribed within and sharing the edges of the icosahedron.

References

External links 
 
 
 Uniform polyhedra and duals

Polyhedral stellation
Regular polyhedra
Kepler–Poinsot polyhedra